EventMachine is a software system designed for writing highly scalable applications for Ruby. It provides event-driven I/O using the reactor pattern. EventMachine is the most popular library for concurrent computing in the Ruby programming language.

Example uses 
EventMachine has been used to build a number of different libraries and frameworks in which concurrency is a performance concern. Some examples include:
 critical networked applications
 web servers and proxies
 email and IM production systems
 authentication/authorization processors

See also 

Application server
Netty (software)
Node.js
Twisted (software)

References

External links 
 EventMachine on GitHub

Free network-related software
Ruby (programming language)